Oswego County is a county in the U.S. state of New York. As of the 2020 census, the population was 117,525. The county seat is Oswego. The county name is from a Mohawk-language word meaning "the pouring out place", referring to the point at which the Oswego River feeds into Lake Ontario at the northern edge of the county in the city of Oswego.

Oswego County is part of the Syracuse, NY Metropolitan Statistical Area.

History
When counties were established in the British colony of New York in 1683, the present Oswego County was part of Albany County. This was an enormous county, including the northern part of what is now New York state as well as all of the present state of Vermont and, in theory, extending westward to the Pacific Ocean. This county was reduced in size on July 3, 1766, by the creation of Cumberland County in the British colony, and further on March 16, 1770, by the creation of Gloucester County, both containing territory now in Vermont.

On March 12, 1772, what was left of Albany County was split into three parts, one remaining under the name Albany County. One of the other pieces, Tryon County, contained the western portion (and thus, since no western boundary was specified, theoretically still extended west to the Pacific). The area then designated as Tryon County now includes 37 counties of New York State. The county was named for William Tryon, colonial governor of New York.

In the years prior to 1776, most of the Loyalists in Tryon County fled to Canada. In 1784, following the peace treaty that ended the American Revolutionary War, the name of Tryon County was changed to Montgomery County to honor the general, Richard Montgomery, who had captured several places in Canada and died attempting to capture the city of Quebec, replacing the name of the hated British governor.

In 1789, the size of Montgomery County was reduced by the splitting off of Ontario County from Montgomery. The actual area split off from Montgomery County was much larger than the present county, also including the present Allegany, Cattaraugus, Chautauqua, Erie, Genesee, Livingston, Monroe, Niagara, Orleans, Steuben, Wyoming, Yates, and part of Schuyler and Wayne counties.

Oswego County was partly in Macomb's Purchase of 1791.

In 1791, Herkimer County was one of three counties split off from Montgomery (the other two being Otsego, and Tioga County). This was much larger than the present county, however, and was reduced by a number of subsequent splits.

In 1794, Onondaga County was created from a part of Herkimer County. This county was larger than the current Onondaga County, including the present Cayuga, Cortland, and part of Oswego counties.

In 1798, Oneida County was created from a part of Herkimer County. This county was larger than the current Oneida County, including the present Jefferson, Lewis, and part of Oswego counties.

In 1805, Oneida County was reduced in size by the splitting off of Jefferson and Lewis counties.

In 1816, Oswego County was created as New York State's 48th county from parts of Oneida and Onondaga counties.

In 1841, businessmen in Oswego attempted to divide Oswego County into two counties. They failed to persuade the State to do so, however. Occasionally, the topic still comes up today by dividing the county into an east part and a west part, with the east portion being renamed "Salmon County".

At various times, beginning in 1847 and as late as 1975, attempts were made to move the county seat to the Village of Mexico. However, none of these attempts succeeded.

On April 20, 2002, at around 6:50 am, many residents of Oswego County were shaken awake by a magnitude 5.2 earthquake centered near Plattsburgh, New York. Minor damage to a Fire Hall in Altmar was the only report of damage. No injuries were sustained.

During 1–12 February 2007, a major lake effect snowfall dumped over ten feet of snow in many places in Oswego County, resulting in several roof collapses, some communities being cut off, and some people being snowed-in in their homes. A state of emergency was declared for the county, and the National Guard was sent in to help clear the snow.

Government and politics

|}

The Oswego County Legislature has 25 members, elected from equal population districts, reduced from 36 in 1993. The legislators are split between seven committees that meet monthly and also attend a general meeting once per month. The seven standing committees as of December 2019 were Government, Courts and Consumer Affairs; Public Safety; Infrastructure, Facilities and Technology; Economic Development and Planning; Health; Human Services; and Finance and Personnel.

In the 2019 general election, the county GOP won three more seats previously occupied by Democrats, expanding its control of the legislature to 23–2. The two Democratic candidates who were elected ran unopposed, and there was only one other Democrat running for any of the 25 seats. Meanwhile, a proposition that sought to expand legislator terms from two years to four years was rejected, with 65.06 percent of 17,701 total votes countywide going against the proposition.

District representation (2020) 

Oswego County has two representatives in the state assembly, with Republicans Will Barclay and Brian Manktelow both serving as assemblymen for portions of the county. Barclay, of Pulaski was unanimously elected by a vote of his GOP Assembly peers to lead the State Assembly Republicans on Jan. 7, 2020.

Sen. Patty Ritchie, R-Oswegatchie, represents the 48th district that includes Oswego County in the state senate.

Geography

Oswego County is in northwestern New York State, just north of Syracuse and northwest of Utica, on the eastern shore of Lake Ontario. The Salmon River Falls, a  waterfall, is a popular sightseeing destination in the northeastern portion of the county.

There are two harbors in the county: Oswego Harbor at the mouth of the Oswego River and Port Ontario on the Salmon River. The first major port of call on the Great Lakes is the Port of Oswego Authority dock.

Adjacent counties 
 Jefferson County – north
 Lewis County – northeast
 Oneida County – east
 Madison County – southeast
 Onondaga County – south
 Cayuga County – southwest

Major highways

  Interstate 81
  U.S. Route 11
  New York State Route 3
  New York State Route 13
  New York State Route 48
  New York State Route 49
  New York State Route 69
  New York State Route 104
  New York State Route 104B
  New York State Route 481 (Veterans Memorial Highway)

Demographics

As of the census of 2000, there were 122,377 people, 45,522 households, and 31,228 families residing in the county.  The population density was 128 people per square mile (50/km2).  There were 52,831 housing units at an average density of 55 per square mile (21/km2).  The racial makeup of the county was 97.17% White, 0.59% Black or African American, 0.41% Native American, 0.42% Asian, 0.01% Pacific Islander, 0.48% from other races, and 0.93% from two or more races. Hispanic or Latino of any race were 1.30% of the population. 15.5% were of Irish, 14.0% German, 13.7% Italian, 13.3% English, 9.6% American, 7.9% French and 5.3% Polish ancestry according to Census 2000. 96.2% spoke English and 1.7% Spanish as their first language.

There were 45,522 households, out of which 35.00% had children under the age of 18 living with them, 52.80% were married couples living together, 10.80% had a female householder with no husband present, and 31.40% were non-families. 24.30% of all households were made up of individuals, and 9.70% had someone living alone who was 65 years of age or older.  The average household size was 2.60 and the average family size was 3.08.

In the county, the population was spread out, with 26.80% under the age of 18, 10.90% from 18 to 24, 28.90% from 25 to 44, 22.10% from 45 to 64, and 11.30% who were 65 years of age or older.  The median age was 35 years. For every 100 females there were 97.50 males.  For every 100 females age 18 and over, there were 94.40 males.

The median income for a household in the county was $36,598, and the median income for a family was $43,821. Males had a median income of $34,976 versus $23,938 for females. The per capita income for the county was $16,853.  About 9.70% of families and 14.00% of the population were below the poverty line, including 17.10% of those under age 18 and 9.50% of those age 65 or over.

Oswego County is also home to two colleges: State University of New York at Oswego in the Town of Oswego and the Fulton Branch Campus of Cayuga County Community College in the City of Fulton.

2020 Census

Communities

Oswego County has 22 towns, 2 cities, and 10 villages.

Larger settlements

† - County Seat

†† - Former Village

‡ - Not Wholly In This County

Towns

 Albion
 Amboy
 Boylston
 Constantia
 Granby
 Hannibal
 Hastings
 Mexico
 Minetto
 New Haven
 Orwell
 Oswego
 Palermo
 Parish
 Redfield
 Richland
 Sandy Creek
 Schroeppel
 Scriba
 Volney
 West Monroe
 Williamstown

Nature 
Swimming places in the county include

on Lake Ontario
 Selkirk Shores State Park
 Sandy Island Beach State Park
 Mexico Point State Park
 Salmon River Lighthouse and Marina (Selkirk Light?)

Unofficial swimming places include
 "The Rocks" in the city of Oswego, on the west side of the west breakwater defining Oswego Harbor (so outside of the harbor)

Swimming on Oneida Lake
 Taft Bay Park at Bernhards Bay, New York, and other swimming on Oneida Lake.  Oswego County includes the majority of the northern shore of the lake, running east to the hamlet of Cleveland, New York.  It also includes all of the lake surface from the north shore to the south shore, which is the northern edge of Onondaga and Madison counties.  So swimming out from beaches on the southern shore, even, puts you in Oswego County.  Oswego County runs east along the south shore almost to the hamlet of Lakeport.

Pool swimming includes
 Brennan Beach RV Resort
 Gallager Pool in Oswego
 Scriba Town Park
 Fulton City Pools

Economy

Oswego's economy is most prominent as industry; in 2012, manufactured shipments made up $2.1 billion of the local economy. Retail made up the next most prominent sector, totaling $1.2 billion or more than $10,000 per resident. Wholesale merchants also made $368 million sales the same year. Services made up the final total, equal to over $500 million in food service, healthcare, accommodation, and social services.

See also

 List of counties in New York
 National Register of Historic Places listings in Oswego County, New York

References

Further reading

External links

 Oswego County Government site
 President Andrew Jackson’s BIG Cheese Tasting, from Dairymen of Oswego County Shapell Manuscript Foundation
 
 Links to the early history of Oswego County, New York
 Oswego County history pages
 State University of New York (SUNY) Oswego
 Cayuga Community College

 
Syracuse metropolitan area
1816 establishments in New York (state)
Populated places established in 1816
New York placenames of Native American origin